The 1932–33 season was the 60th season of competitive football in Scotland and the 43rd season of the Scottish Football League.

Scottish League Division One 

Champions: Rangers
Relegated: Greenock Morton, East Stirlingshire

Scottish League Division Two 

NOTE:  Armadale & Bo'ness were expelled for failing to meet match guarantees; their records were expunged.

Promoted: Hibernian, Queen of the South

Scottish Cup 

Celtic were winners of the Scottish Cup with a 1–0 final win over Motherwell.

Other honours

National

County 

 – aggregate over two legs

Highland League

Junior Cup 
Yoker Athletic were winners of the Junior Cup after a 4–2 win over Tranent in the final replay.

Scotland national team 

Key:
 (H) = Home match
 (A) = Away match
 BHC = British Home Championship

Notes and references

External links 
 Scottish Football Historical Archive

 
Seasons in Scottish football
Scotland
Scotland
Scottish Football, 1932-33 In
Scottish Football, 1932-33 In